Samuel Thomas Dekker (born May 6, 1994) is an American professional basketball player for the London Lions of the British Basketball League (BBL) and the EuroCup. Dekker played college basketball for the Wisconsin Badgers. After finishing college on a championship game run in the 2015 NCAA Tournament, Dekker was selected by the Houston Rockets with the 18th overall pick in the 2015 NBA draft.

High school career
Dekker was named the Wisconsin Gatorade Player of the Year following his senior season. He was also named 2012 Parade All-American, AP first-team all-state and Wisconsin Basketball Coaches' Association's Mr. Basketball award. He led Sheboygan Lutheran to the school's first-ever WIAA state title. Dekker scored 40 points, including the last 12, in the state title game including the game-winning three-point shot with two seconds left.

College career

Freshman season
Dekker played in 35 games (3 starts) as a freshman on the Wisconsin Badgers. He is one of only four true freshman to start under Bo Ryan joining Devin Harris, Alando Tucker and Josh Gasser. He earned Big Ten All-Freshman team recognition as well as honorable mention All-Big Ten honors. He was also two-time Big Ten Freshman of the Week (January 14 and March 4, 2013). Dekker scored a season-high 19 points against Arkansas on November 24, 2012, and Nebraska on February 26, 2013.

Sophomore season
Before the season, Dekker was named to the Wooden Award and Naismith Trophy watch lists.

At the conclusion of the regular season in which he started all 38 games, Dekker was named to the Second Team All-Big Ten by the coaches and Third Team All-Big Ten by the media.

Junior season
Before the season, Dekker was named to the Wooden Award and Naismith Trophy watch lists.
 
At the conclusion of the regular season, Dekker was named to the Second Team All-Big Ten by the coaches and by the media. But he really only took off in the NCAA Tournament. In the Sweet 16 against the number four seeded North Carolina Tar Heels, Dekker scored a career high 23 points and grabbed 10 rebounds to lead the 1-seed Wisconsin to a 79–72 victory. In the Elite 8 against the number 2-seeded Arizona Wildcats, Dekker again came up big, scoring a new career high 27 points, including 5 of the Badgers's 10 second-half threes, the final of which is now known nationally as the "Dekker Dagger" shot because it sealed the win for Wisconsin. For these efforts, he was named West Regional Most Outstanding Player during the 2015 NCAA Men's Division I Basketball Tournament. In the Final Four game against the heavily favored and undefeated Kentucky Wildcats, Dekker came through with another huge game, scoring 16 points, including the three that gave Wisconsin the lead for good. The Badgers finished second in the NCAA tournament after losing to Duke in the championship game. A week later, Dekker declared for the 2015 NBA draft, forgoing his final year of college eligibility.

Professional career

Houston Rockets (2015–2017)
On June 25, 2015, Dekker was selected by the Houston Rockets with the 18th overall pick in the 2015 NBA draft. On July 7, he signed his rookie scale contract with the Rockets but subsequently missed the entire 2015 NBA Summer League due to a back injury. He appeared in all eight of the Rockets' preseason games, but managed game time in just three of the team's first 11 regular-season games. On November 18, 2015, he was ruled out for three months after requiring back surgery. On February 19, 2016, he was assigned to the Rio Grande Valley Vipers, the Rockets' D-League affiliate, on a rehab assignment. He was recalled by the Rockets on February 22. He went on to receive two more assignments to the Vipers.

On December 14, 2016, Dekker scored a career-high 19 points in a 132–98 win over the Sacramento Kings. On January 21, 2017, he made his first career start and set a new career high with 30 points in a 119–95 win over the Memphis Grizzlies.

Los Angeles Clippers (2017–2018)
On June 28, 2017, the Los Angeles Clippers acquired Dekker, Patrick Beverley, Montrezl Harrell, Darrun Hilliard, DeAndre Liggins, Lou Williams, Kyle Wiltjer and a 2018 first-round pick from the Houston Rockets in exchange for Chris Paul.

Cleveland Cavaliers (2018)
On August 7, 2018, Dekker was traded, along with the draft rights to Renaldas Seibutis and cash considerations, to the Cleveland Cavaliers in exchange for the draft rights to Vladimir Veremeenko.

Washington Wizards (2018–2019)
On December 7, 2018, Dekker was traded to the Washington Wizards in a five-player, three-team deal.  The Wizards traded Jason Smith and cash considerations to the Milwaukee Bucks. The Bucks sent John Henson, Matthew Dellavedova, and 2021 first- and second-round picks to the Cleveland Cavaliers and received George Hill and a 2021 second-round pick. The Wizards also sent a 2022 second-round pick to the Cavs.

Lokomotiv Kuban (2019–2020)
On August 5, 2019, Dekker signed with Russian club PBC Lokomotiv Kuban of the VTB United League and the EuroCup.

Türk Telekom (2020–2021)
On July 23, 2020, Dekker signed with Türk Telekom of the Turkish Super League (BSL).

Toronto Raptors (2021)
On August 10, 2021, Dekker signed with the Toronto Raptors. However, he was waived on November 6, after making a single regular season appearance.

Bahçeşehir Koleji (2021–2022)

On December 4, 2021, Dekker signed with Bahçeşehir Koleji of the Turkish Basketball Super League. The team won the 2021-22 FIBA Europe Cup, with Dekker averaging 13.1 points and 7.2 rebounds per game. He helped Bahçeşehir win the 2021–22 FIBA Europe Cup, contributing averages of 11 points and 5.5 rebounds in the Finals.

London Lions (2022–present) 
On August 7, 2022, Dekker signed with London Lions of the British Basketbal League (BBL) and the EuroCup.

Personal life

Dekker has remained a Sheboygan resident throughout his NBA career. In November 2016, Dekker purchased a 1,568-square-foot condo on the Sheboygan River for $289,000.

In May 2017, Dekker became engaged to Olivia Harlan, an ESPN and SEC Network reporter, daughter of NBA announcer Kevin Harlan, and granddaughter of NFL Green Bay Packers Chairman Emeritus Bob Harlan. The two were married on July 14, 2018.

National team career
In Summer 2012, Dekker was on the under-18 United States national team that defeated Brazil for the gold medal in the FIBA Americas championship, but his play was limited due to an injury.

Career statistics

NBA

Regular season

|-
| style="text-align:left;"| 
| style="text-align:left;"| Houston
| 3 || 0 || 2.0 || .000 || .000 || .000 || .3 || .0 || .3 || .0 || .0
|-
| style="text-align:left;"| 
| style="text-align:left;"| Houston
| 77 || 2 || 18.4 || .473 || .321 || .559 || 3.7 || 1.0 || .5 || .3 || 6.5
|-
| style="text-align:left;"| 
| style="text-align:left;"| L.A. Clippers
| 73 || 1 || 12.1 || .494 || .167 || .661 || 2.4 || .5 || .3 || .1 || 4.2
|-
| style="text-align:left;"| 
| style="text-align:left;"| Cleveland
| 9 || 5 || 18.8 || .458 || .385 || .800 || 3.7 || 1.0 || 1.2 || .0 || 6.3
|-
| style="text-align:left;"| 
| style="text-align:left;"| Washington
| 38 || 0 || 16.3 || .471 || .286 || .556 || 3.0 || 1.0 || .7 || .2 || 6.1
|-
| style="text-align:left;"| 
| style="text-align:left;"| Toronto
| 1 || 0 || 1.0 || – || – || – || .0 || .0 || .0 || .0 || .0
|- class="sortbottom"
| style="text-align:center;" colspan="2"| Career
| 201 || 8 || 15.4 || .478 || .288 || .606 || 3.0 || .8 || .5 || .2 || 5.5

Playoffs

|-
| style="text-align:left;"| 2017
| style="text-align:left;"| Houston
| 4 || 0 || 7.8 || .250 || .500 || .000 || 2.5 || .3 || .3 || .3 || 2.3
|- class="sortbottom"
| style="text-align:center;" colspan="2"| Career
| 4 || 0 || 7.8 || .250 || .500 || .000 || 2.5 || .3 || .3 || .3 || 2.3

College

|-
| style="text-align:left;"| 2012–13
| style="text-align:left;"| Wisconsin
| 35 || 3 || 22.3 || .476 || .391 || .690 || 3.4 || 1.3 || .7 || .4 || 9.6
|-
| style="text-align:left;"| 2013–14
| style="text-align:left;"| Wisconsin
| 38 || 38 || 29.8 || .469 || .326 || .686 || 6.1 || 1.4 || .8 || .6 || 12.4
|-
| style="text-align:left;"| 2014–15
| style="text-align:left;"| Wisconsin
| 40 || 40 || 31.0 || .525 || .331 || .708 || 5.5 || 1.2 || .5 || .5 || 13.9
|- class="sortbottom"
| style="text-align:center;" colspan="2"| Career 
| 113 || 81 || 27.9 || .493 || .348 || .695 || 5.0 || 1.3 || .6 || .5 || 12.1

Eurocup

|-
| style="text-align:left;"| 2019–20
| style="text-align:left;"| Lokomotiv Kuban
| 10 || 8 || 27.0 || .705 || .303 || .789 || 5.3 || 1.5 || .9 || .6 || 13.1 || 15.6

References

External links

Wisconsin Badgers bio

1994 births
Living people
American expatriate basketball people in Canada
American expatriate basketball people in Russia
American expatriate basketball people in Turkey
American men's basketball players
Bahçeşehir Koleji S.K. players
Basketball players from Wisconsin
Cleveland Cavaliers players
Houston Rockets draft picks
Houston Rockets players
Los Angeles Clippers players
Parade High School All-Americans (boys' basketball)
PBC Lokomotiv-Kuban players
Power forwards (basketball)
Rio Grande Valley Vipers players
Small forwards
Sportspeople from Sheboygan, Wisconsin
Toronto Raptors players
Türk Telekom B.K. players
Washington Wizards players
Wisconsin Badgers men's basketball players
London Lions (basketball) players